Juan Cilley (22 February 1898 – 25 February 1954) was an Argentine footballer. He played in one match for the Argentina national football team in 1919. He was also part of Argentina's squad for the 1919 South American Championship.

References

External links
 

1898 births
1954 deaths
Argentine footballers
Argentina international footballers
Place of birth missing
Association football midfielders
Estudiantes de La Plata footballers
Club Atlético San Isidro football players